is a Japanese announcer, tarento, television presenter, and newscaster represented by Furutachi-Project. He was an announcer for TV Asahi. He graduated from Kita Kuritsu Takinogawa Daini (No. 2) Elementary School, Chiyoda Kuritsu Kanda Hitotsubashi Junior High School, Rikkyo Niiza Junior and Senior High School, and Rikkyo University Faculty of Economics Department of Business Administration. Controversy erupted when he stepped down as the anchor of TV Asahi's evening news broadcast, Hōdō Station, a removal that was reportedly due to political pressure in response to the show's critical tone.

Filmography

TV and radio series

Moderator, commentator

Dramas

Advertisements

Stage

References

External links
 

1954 births
Living people
People from Tokyo
Japanese announcers
Japanese entertainers
Japanese television presenters
Japanese journalists
Rikkyo University alumni